Peter John Wheeler, CBE  (born 26 November 1948) is a former  international rugby union player who played hooker and was Chief Executive of Leicester Tigers.

Early life
Wheeler attended Brockley County Grammar School and went on to play for Old Brockleians Rugby Club and Kent for three seasons.

Playing career
Wheeler was considered a tough and technically proficient hooker and was integral to Leicester's innovative and expansive style of play. Wheeler captained Leicester Tigers to three consecutive wins in the John Player Cup from 1979 to 1981 and played 349 games for the club from 1969 to 1985.

He was an early advocate of league rugby in the 1980s.

He made his England debut on 1 February 1975 against France, and his last appearance on 17 March 1984 against Wales, gaining 41 caps in between, including 5 as captain.

He went on the 1977 British Lions tour to New Zealand and the 1980 British Lions tour to South Africa.

Rugby administration

Wheeler coached Tigers in the inaugural league season which ended with them as champions. He then joined the Tigers organising committee.

When open professionalism was declared in 1996 he was appointed the Chief Executive of Leicester Tigers and held the position until 2010 when he was appointed "Rugby Director", though this saw little change to his day to day role. He retired in 2015 and was made a life member of Leicester, who he had served in various roles over 40 years.

References

External links
Rugby Heroes
 scrum.com statistics

1948 births
Living people
Commanders of the Order of the British Empire
Deputy Lieutenants of Leicestershire
English rugby union players
Leicester Tigers players
England international rugby union players
British & Irish Lions rugby union players from England
Rugby union hookers
Rugby union players from London